Princess Hermine may refer to:

Princess Hermine of Anhalt-Bernburg-Schaumburg-Hoym (1797-1817), an Archduchess of Austria through her marriage to Archduke Joseph, Palatine of Hungary
Hermine Reuss of Greiz (1887-1947), second wife of Wilhelm II, German Emperor